Professor Narayana Sadashiv Pharande or popularly known as N. S. Pharande was an Indian politician. He was a leader of the Bharatiya Janata Party from Ahmednagar Constituency, Maharashtra. He was a member of Maharashtra Legislative Council and served as its chairman.

References

Living people
Chairs of the Maharashtra Legislative Council
People from Ahmednagar district
Marathi politicians
Bharatiya Janata Party politicians from Maharashtra
Members of the Maharashtra Legislative Council
Year of birth missing (living people)